Mehreen Saeed Faruqi (born 8 July 1963) is an Australian politician and former engineer who has been a Senator for New South Wales since 15 August 2018, representing the Greens. She was chosen to fill a casual vacancy caused by the resignation of Lee Rhiannon, before being elected in her own right in 2019. She had previously served in the New South Wales Legislative Council between June 2013 and August 2018. Since June 2022, Faruqi has served as Deputy Leader of the Australian Greens.

Early life
Faruqi was born in Lahore, Pakistan. Her father, a civil engineer, was a professor at the University of Engineering and Technology (UET) in Lahore and she grew up on the UET campus. She graduated from UET with a Bachelor of Engineering (Civil) degree in 1988, and subsequently worked as a structural engineer.  Her older brothers, younger sister, husband, and father-in-law are also civil engineers. Faruqi and her husband Omar moved to Sydney in 1992, where she began attending the University of New South Wales (UNSW); her father had previously studied there under the Colombo Plan in the 1950s. She completed a Master of Engineering Science degree in 1994, and later received a doctorate in environmental engineering in 2000, with her doctoral thesis titled "Intensification of anaerobic lagoons for abattoir wastewater treatment and biogas recovery". Faruqi moved to Port Macquarie in 2001, but moved back to Sydney in 2006. She and her husband have two children together, including Osman Faruqi, a political journalist.

Faruqi is one of three MPs in the 46th Parliament of Australia who graduated high school outside of Australia (the others being Gladys Liu and Kristina Keneally), and is one of eleven MPs in the 46th Parliament of Australia who possesses a PhD (the others being Katie Allen, Fiona Martin, Anne Aly, Andrew Leigh, Daniel Mulino, Jess Walsh, Adam Bandt, Jim Chalmers, Anne Webster and Helen Haines).

Career

Engineering career
Before her appointment to the Legislative Council, Faruqi had a 25-year career as a professional engineer and academic. She worked in positions in local government, consulting firms and higher education institutions in Australia and internationally. These included roles such as Manager of Environment and Services at Mosman Council, Manager of Natural Resources and Catchments for Port Macquarie-Hastings Council, and as the Director of the Institute of Environmental Studies at UNSW.

At the time she was appointed to the New South Wales parliament, she was Academic Director of the Master of Business and Technology Program and an associate professor at the Australian Graduate School of Management for UNSW.

State politics
Faruqi joined the Greens in 2004 in Port Macquarie and ran as a candidate for the Legislative Assembly seat of Heffron in 2011 and at the 2012 by-election. She was chosen to replace Cate Faehrmann in the Legislative Council in 2013, becoming the first Muslim woman to be a member of an Australian parliament. Her term in the Council began on 19 June 2013.

In parliament, Faruqi held several portfolios for The Greens NSW: Animal Welfare, Drugs and Harm Minimisation, Environment, Lower Mid North Coast, Multiculturalism, Roads & Ports, Status of Women, Transport, Western Sydney, and Young People.

Faruqi is a vocal pro-choice advocate, introducing the first parliamentary bill to decriminalise abortion in New South Wales in June 2014. Faruqi is also an advocate for public transport and environmental sustainability. In March 2014, she successfully moved a motion in parliament ordering the release of all government documents relating to the creation of the business case for the WestConnex motorway. This uncovered evidence of the NSW government's plan for mass outsourcing of public service work and uncertainty among WestConnex staff and advisers on the viability of the project.

In February 2018, Faruqi attempted to block the Christian Friends of Israeli Communities from hosting an event on the basis of Israel's settlement policy in the West Bank

Faruqi resigned her position in the parliament after giving her farewell speech on 14 August 2018.

Federal politics 
On 25 November 2017, Faruqi defeated incumbent New South Wales Greens Senator Lee Rhiannon in a pre-selection contest for the first spot on the NSW Greens Senate ballot at the 2019 federal election. Rhiannon resigned her Senate position on 15 August 2018 and on the same day Faruqi was appointed to fill the vacant seat by a joint sitting of the New South Wales Parliament. She was sworn in on 20 August 2018, becoming the first female Muslim senator in Australian history.

Faruqi was re-elected in the 2019 federal election, securing 8.7% of the state's vote, with a swing of 1.32 points in her favour.

Following the 2022 federal election, Faruqi was elected as the Deputy Leader of the Australian Greens.

Following the death of Elizabeth II, Faruqi stated “I cannot mourn the leader of a racist empire built on stolen lives, land and wealth of colonised peoples" as she called for a republic. Faruqi was criticized for the comments, and later subject to racial abuse over them

Key published works
 Harding, R, Hendriks, CM, and Faruqi, M. (2009). Environmental Decision-Making - Exploring complexity and context, Federation Press, Sydney. 
 Faruqi, M. (2012). 'Embracing Complexity To Enable Change', in: D. Rigling Gallagher; N. Christiansen and P. Andrews; eds, Environmental Leadership: A Reference Handbook, Vol. 2, pp. 772–781, Sage, Thousand Oaks, California.

Awards
 Judy Raper Award for Leadership in Engineering, UNSW School of Chemical Engineering (2013).
 Edna Ryan Grand Stirrer Award (2017) for her tireless work on the Abortion Law Reform campaign, for "inciting others to challenge the status quo"

References

External links

 Greens MPs Homepage
 
 Summary of parliamentary voting for Senator Mehreen Faruqi on TheyVoteForYou.org.au

Living people
Australian Greens members of the Parliament of New South Wales
Members of the New South Wales Legislative Council
Australian Greens members of the Parliament of Australia
Australian feminists
Women members of the Australian Senate
Members of the Australian Senate
Members of the Australian Senate for New South Wales
University of Engineering and Technology, Lahore alumni
University of New South Wales alumni
Academic staff of the University of New South Wales
Pakistani emigrants to Australia
Punjabi people
Australian people of Punjabi descent
Australian politicians of Pakistani descent
Australian civil engineers
21st-century Australian politicians
21st-century Australian women politicians
Women members of the New South Wales Legislative Council
1963 births
Australian republicans